Joshua M. Lidani (born 1 October 1957) is a former Senator for the Gombe South constituency of Gombe State, Nigeria. Before being elected in 2011, he practiced law. He is a member of All Progressives Congress  (APC).

References

1957 births
Living people
Peoples Democratic Party members of the Senate (Nigeria)
Ahmadu Bello University alumni
People from Gombe State